Bolt On Technology is an American business-to-business software development company based in Southampton, Pennsylvania, that designs, develops and sells add-on software for the automotive aftermarket industry in North America.

History 
Bolt On Technology develops software to equip the automotive repair and maintenance aftermarket with tools that improve customer communication and streamlines shops’ day-to-day operations, proven to increase car counts, productivity and revenue.

Mitchell 1, an affiliate of Snap-On tools, licensed three of Bolt On Technology's software products in 2011, branded them as their own, and began selling them across North America. The following year, Mitchell 1 sold close to 1,000 units of the bundled software package. Today, auto repair shops throughout the U.S., Canada, and Guam use these modules.

In the fall of 2013, they released Mobile Manager Pro, which features digital vehicle inspections, that can photograph, upload and share details of repairs and inspections via text message reports to customers. Mobile Manager Pro went through rounds of updates and was re-launched in the summer of 2014. During the summer of 2014, Welcome Station Kiosk was released. Similar to kiosks used in restaurants, grocery stores, and airports, the check-in tool lets repair shop customers select vehicle services, as well as update their contact and vehicle information.

In 2017, Review Manager was introduced, a tool that lets shops regulate and respond to customer reviews. The company also introduced Bolt On University in 2017, a training program that teaches impactful business practices and how to use the company's software to its full potential. The training program teaches automotive shop owners how the software works and why it's essential to driving success for repair shops. The sessions, held in markets around the country, provide shop owners with the opportunity to network with other shops to share best practices and successes. In November 2018, the company announced a milestone of 20 million photos shared through the software.

The software transmits photos, videos, and text messages to communicate automotive repair details. The company's products are used by a growing number of automotive repair shop owners and operators among service centers throughout the United States, serving 6,000 shops as of January 2019.

Partnerships 
In 2018, Bolt On Technology partnered with Elite Worldwide, a shop management training and coaching company. The combination of efficiency, technology, and training in business practices will create better opportunities for success for repair shops.

The companies deliver cohosted webinars for shop owners who want to invest in their businesses that focus on topics such as employee management, advantages of digital inspections, finding hidden profits in shops  and tips for hiring top talent. They are planning at least six sessions in 2019.

References 

Online automotive companies of the United States